Davoud Soleymani (داوود سلیمانی) is an Iranian politician. Soleymani was the Vice Minister of Studental Affairs in Ministry of Science, Research and Technology under the ministrant of former Minister Mostafa Moin.

He was also a representative from Tehran on sixth term of Iranian Islamic Parliament, Majlis.

References

Deputies of Tehran, Rey, Shemiranat and Eslamshahr
Iranian Vice Ministers
Living people
Year of birth missing (living people)
Islamic Iran Participation Front politicians
Members of the 6th Islamic Consultative Assembly
Tehran Councillors 1999–2003
Islamic Association of University Instructors politicians